Asociación Deportivo Cali, best known as Deportivo Cali, is a Colombian sports club based in Cali, most notable for its football team, which currently competes in the Categoría Primera A.

Deportivo Cali is one of the most successful football teams in Colombia, having won ten domestic league championships, one Copa Colombia and one Superliga Colombiana, for a total of twelve titles. Their stadium, Estadio Deportivo Cali, with an original capacity of 61,890, is the largest football stadium in Colombia, but has recently seen reductions in capacity due to renovations. 

Deportivo Cali is the only Colombian football club that owns its own stadium, and the only club in Colombia to be owned by its fans. It was also the first Colombian team to reach the Copa Libertadores final in 1978. In 2016, Forbes listed Deportivo Cali as the 36th most valuable football team of the Americas.

History

Amateur era
Cali Football Club was formed in 1908 by students under the leadership of Nazario Lalinde, Juan Pablo Lalinde and Fidel Lalinde, who came back from Europe bringing football to the city of Cali, but in 1912 the students under the leadership of the three Lalinde brothers organized the team and renamed it as Deportivo Cali beginning practice under their first coach, Catalan born Francisco Villa Bisa. Their first match was between CFC "A" and CFC "B" in the Versailles pitch, with 300 spectators in attendance. By 1928 the name was changed to "Deportivo Cali A" and the club represented the Valle del Cauca Department in the National Games, earning the titles between 1928 and 1930.

In 1945 several clubs decided to become part of the club adding new sports to the institution such as athletics, basketball, and swimming. During the next several years the club played against teams from the country and by 1948 the team was ready to play its first professional season in the newly created national league. Their first game was a defeat against Junior in Barranquilla by a 2–0 score, and their first match at home was a 2–2 draw against Deportes Caldas. The first victory came in the fourth match against Atlético Nacional (then Atlético Municipal) by a 4–1 score. They would end the season in eighth place with a record of 6 victories, 4 draws and 8 defeats.

Golden years
Between 1965 and 1974 Deportivo Cali saw its golden era. During this period, Deportivo Cali reached 11 finals, from which they won five of their nine Colombian championship titles in 1965, 1967, 1969, 1970, and 1974. It was then that Deportivo Cali was one of the top teams from the Colombian national league, along with Bogotá sides Millonarios and Santa Fe. It was also during this time period that Deportivo Cali had many of the best players to come across the Colombian football league. This team included: José Rosendo Toledo, "El Moño" Muñoz, Miguel Escobar, Óscar López, Mario Sanclemente, German "El Burrito" González, Jose Yudica, Miguel Ángel "El Mago" Loayza, Jairo "El Maestrico" Arboleda, Oscar Mario "Tranvia" Desiderio, Diego Edison Umaña, Henry "La Mosca" Caicedo, Iroldo Rodriguez de Oliveira, Jorge Ramírez Gallego, Roberto Álvarez, Quarentinha, Bernardo "El Cunda" Valencia, and Ricardo Pegnoty. Unfortunately, most of these players did not receive international fame, yet Jairo Arboleda could have been one of the best players Colombia has had in midfield along with Carlos "El Pibe" Valderrama. Similar to Valderrama, Arboleda used a variety of skill and "magic" that left opponents lost and beaten, which gave rise to his nickname "El Maestrico". He is mostly recognized in Cali as one of Colombia's best players ever. Arboleda was unfortunate to be called to the Colombia national football team at a time when the team was not fully developed and organized, largely preventing him from showing away his skill at an international level. In 1978 Deportivo Cali became the first Colombian club to reach the Copa Libertadores final, losing against Boca Juniors.

During the 1980s, whilst América de Cali and Atlético Nacional started their emergence and consolidation as Colombian football powers, Deportivo Cali began to fall behind in championship titles and ended up as league runners-up behind its crosstown rival twice in a row, in 1985 and 1986. The key players for Deportivo Cali at the time were "El Pibe" Valderrama and Bernardo Redín, none of whom was able to win a title with the club.

In 1996, the club broke a 22-year domestic title drought under the guidance of coach Fernando "El Pecoso" Castro, and famous goalkeeper Miguel "El Show" Calero. The title was sealed after a scoreless draw with crosstown rivals América on the last matchday of the championship round, which ensured the team would end ahead of Millonarios on bonus points. Two years later and with José Eugenio "Cheché" Hernández as manager, Deportivo Cali won its seventh title after finishing in the top eight of the Finalización tournament, and topping a semifinal group including Atlético Nacional, Millonarios, and América de Cali. This qualified the team for the finals against Once Caldas, whom they defeated 4–0 in the first leg in Cali and tied 0–0 in Manizales in the second leg in order to claim the title.

Deportivo Cali qualified for the 1999 Copa Libertadores as Colombian champions, and qualified out of a group which also included Once Caldas, and Argentine sides River Plate and Vélez Sarsfield. After eliminating Colo-Colo in the round of 16, Uruguayan side Bella Vista in the quarterfinals and Cerro Porteño in the semifinals, they managed to reach the final of the competition for the second time in its history. Unfortunately, luck was not on their side and they lost to Palmeiras of Brazil on penalties after winning the first leg in Cali 1–0 and losing 2–1 in the return leg in São Paulo. Venezuelan goalkeeper Rafael Dudamel, defenders Hernán Gaviria, Mario Yepes, and Gerardo Bedoya, and midfielders Arley Betancourt, Mayer Candelo, and Martín Zapata were some of the most important players of the club in both the 1998 national championship and the Copa Libertadores run the following year.

Recent years
In the start of the 21st century, the club has seen a major downfall in quality of players, quality of team and general managers, and overall results in both the domestic league and international competition. On 24 October 2002, players Herman Gaviria and Giovanni Córdoba were hit by lightning during a training session with the team. Gaviria was killed instantly, though he was not pronounced dead until arriving at Valle del Lilí Hospital, while Córdoba died three days later. At the time, the team was leading the 2002 Finalización and was heavily favored to win the title but was unable to recover from this event and ended in second place of its semifinal group, behind eventual champions Independiente Medellín. During this timeframe, Cali won its eighth domestic championship (2005 Finalización), but lost finals to underdog teams such as Deportes Tolima and Deportivo Pasto in the 2003 Finalización and 2006 Apertura tournaments, respectively. The championship in the second tournament of the 2005 season allowed Deportivo Cali to take part in the 2006 Copa Libertadores, in which the team failed to make it out of the group stage after only being able to collect one point out of 18. A poor campaign during the 2007 Finalización caused Deportivo Cali to fail to qualify for the semifinal stage of the domestic league for the first time since short tournaments began being played in Colombian football. Spectators say that the downfall of the 2007 season was a result of the major injury of Sergio Herrera and the departure of Martin Cardetti. Between 2006 and 2007, the club saw over three coaches, and two of them in the 2007 Finalización season alone. The coaches who served Deportivo Cali during this time were Pedro Sarmiento, who won the league with the team as coach in 2005 and was dismissed after losing the 2006 Apertura finals to Deportivo Pasto, Omar Labruna and Néstor Otero.

Uruguayan José Daniel Carreño took the reins ahead of the 2008 season, replacing Néstor Otero. Deportivo Cali, during his management, had an above average Apertura, coming in sixth place which qualified them for the semifinals of the tournament. In the Copa Colombia, the club ended in third place of its group and failed to qualify for further play, which was considered as an embarrassment as Deportivo Cali was the favorite to win the group. During the semifinals of the Apertura, Cali failed to win the first four matches, losing two and tying the remaining two. After failing to win the fourth game (a 2–0 loss to Deportes Quindío at home), Carreño was sacked and replaced by caretaker manager Ricardo Martínez, who managed the team until the end of the 2008 season and qualified it for the 2009 Copa Sudamericana, in which they were knocked out in the first stage by Universidad de Chile. The 2009 season saw Deportivo Cali qualifying for the semifinals of the Apertura tournament but missing out on the finals on goal difference, while in the Finalización tournament they failed to qualify for the semifinals.

In 2010, Deportivo Cali failed to qualify for the final rounds of both the Apertura and the Finalización, but was able to win the Copa Colombia for the first time in history under the management of Jaime de la Pava. Los Azucareros managed to win their regional group and then defeated Junior, Santa Fe, and La Equidad in their run to the final, where they faced surprise package Itagüí Ditaires. Deportivo Cali won both legs of the final, 1–0 in Itagüí and 2–0 at the Estadio Deportivo Cali, which also hosted its first official match that year with a 2–0 victory over Deportes Quindío on 21 February.

In the 2011 Apertura, and despite having one of their worst starts in history by losing the first four games of the season, Deportivo Cali managed to make it to the quarterfinals, where they were eliminated in a penalty shoot-out by eventual champions Atlético Nacional in a match that could have gone either way. Deportivo Cali also competed in the 2011 Copa Sudamericana but were knocked out by Santa Fe on penalties, while in the Torneo Finalización they were unable to qualify for the semifinals. The 2012 season brought similar fortunes: the team qualified for the Apertura semifinals but narrowly missed out on the berth to the final, which ended up going to Deportivo Pasto, and in the Torneo Finalización they were placed in 11th place, thus failing to qualify for the semifinals.

The beginning of a new era
After the disappointing close to the season, Deportivo Cali decided to look for a new coach. On 13 December 2012, they signed Leonel Álvarez as their new head coach. He led Deportivo Cali to the play-offs in both of the tournaments played in 2013, reaching the final of the Torneo Finalización, but losing it to Atlético Nacional. The first leg was played on home soil resulting in a scoreless draw, while the second leg ended in a 2–0 loss. Deportivo Cali would go on to win the 2014 Superliga Colombiana against the same rival, however, Álvarez was fired after a poor start in the 2014 Apertura.

In recent years, the club has become stronger with the formation of young players. In 2015, Cali won the Torneo Apertura and reached the quarterfinals of the Torneo Finalización with a squad formed mostly by youth footballers. That year, the goalscorer of the team was 21-year old Harold Preciado with 25 goals, followed by 20-year old Rafael Santos Borré with 11 goals and 22-year old Miguel Murillo with 10 goals. Other notable young player is 22-year old Andrés Felipe Roa, who was called up for the senior team and played the Olympic Games play-off against United States along with his fellow mates Luis Manuel Orejuela and Kevin Balanta. For the 2016 season, the average age of the squad was 22.8 with 17 players under 21. Deportivo Cali reached another final series in the 2017 Apertura tournament, once again losing to Atlético Nacional after winning the first leg 2–0 at their stadium and losing 5–1 in the return leg played in Medellín.

In 2021, Deportivo Cali won their tenth league title after six years. In the Torneo Apertura, they managed to advance to the knockout stages, losing to Deportes Tolima in the quarter-finals. Their Finalización campaign started with a 2–1 away victory against Santa Fe, however, a subsequent string of poor results caused the dismissal of manager Alfredo Arias midway into the tournament. Former Venezuelan goalkeeper Rafael Dudamel, who was champion with the team as player in 1998 took over, losing the derby to América de Cali in his debut. However, the team's performance improved, and a winning streak of four matches in the final stretch of the first stage helped them qualify for the semi-finals in seventh place. Deportivo Cali were drawn with Atlético Nacional, Junior, and Deportivo Pereira in their semi-final group, clinching qualification for the finals with one match in hand and a 2–0 win against Junior at home. In the finals, they faced Deportes Tolima, in a rematch of the quarter-final series of the previous tournament as well as the 2003 Finalización tournament finals. The first leg, played at the Estadio Deportivo Cali ended in a 1–1 draw, whilst in the second leg played in Ibagué they came from behind to win the game 2–1 and clinch the Primera A title. Harold Preciado, who scored two goals in the final series against Tolima, ended as the tournament's top scorer with 13 goals.

Crest history

Crest evolution

Valle del Cauca Derby

Deportivo Cali's longtime rival is América de Cali. The derby is known either as the "Clásico Vallecaucano" (Valle del Cauca Derby) or the "Clásico de San Fernando" because of the location of the Pascual Guerrero stadium. The first derby was played in 1931 when the final of the Valle del Cauca league was disputed by the two teams. The result was a 1–0 victory for Deportivo Cali. The first derby in the professional era was played in 1948. The first leg was a victory for América 1–0 while in the second leg of the tournament it was a 4–3 victory for Deportivo Cali.

On 10 October 2010 Deportivo Cali and América de Cali played the first derby at the former's new stadium, which was won by Deportivo Cali 6–3 including a hat trick from Argentine player Martin Morel, and three of the most highlighted goals of the tournament. The Derby was not played in the top flight between 2012 and 2016 because of América de Cali's relegation at the end of the 2011 season, however, it kept being played in the Copa Colombia as both teams were drawn together in that competition.

 Total matches played: 317 
Deportivo Cali Victories: 119
América de Cali Victories: 97
Draws: 101

Stadium 

Until 2014, Deportivo Cali played their home matches at Estadio Pascual Guerrero in Cali, which had a capacity of 43,000 and was shared with crosstown rivals América. Although they opened their own Estadio Deportivo Cali in 2008 with a friendly match against Ecuadorian team LDU Quito and played some games there on a temporary basis due to renovations made to Estadio Pascual Guerrero for the 2011 FIFA U-20 World Cup, they moved into their stadium on a permanent basis starting from the 2015 season. Estadio Deportivo Cali, also known as Estadio de Palmaseca, is located in Palmira, in the outskirts of Cali. When it opened, it had a capacity of 52,000, but renovations brought it down to 44,000.

Honours

Domestic
Categoría Primera A:
Winners (10): 1965, 1967, 1969, 1970, 1974, 1995–96, 1998, 2005–II, 2015–I, 2021–II
Runners-up (14): 1949, 1962, 1968, 1972, 1976, 1977, 1978, 1980, 1985, 1986, 2003–II, 2006–I, 2013–II, 2017–I
Copa Colombia:
Winners (1): 2010
Runners-up (2): 1981, 2019
Superliga Colombiana:
Winners (1): 2014
Runners-up (2): 2016, 2022

International
Copa Libertadores:
Runners-up (2): 1978, 1999

Copa Merconorte:
Runners-up (1): 1998

Players

Current squad

Out on loan

Notable players

  Ernesto Cococho Álvarez
  Alberto de Jesús Benítez
  Abel Da Graca
  Rubén Darío Insúa
  Martín Morel
  Cristian Nasuti
  Rubén Ponce de León
  José Sand
  Néstor Scotta
  José Rosendo Toledo
  Jorge Aravena
  Jaime Riveros
  Abel Aguilar
  Adolfo Andrade
  Jairo Arboleda
  Arley Betancourt
  Víctor Bonilla
  Rafael Santos Borré
  Henry Caicedo
  Miguel Calero
  Oswaldo Calero
  Mayer Candelo
  Fernando Castro
  Óscar Córdoba
  Álvaro Domínguez
  Walter Escobar
  Andrés Estrada
  Carlos Estrada
  Frank Fabra
  Hermán Gaviria
  Teófilo Gutiérrez
  Giovanni Hernández
  Carlos Mario Hoyos
  Jhon Kennedy Hurtado
  Edison Mafla
  Faryd Mondragón
  Fredy Montero
  Tressor Moreno
  Luis Muriel
  Elkin Murillo
  Jeison Murillo
  Jámison Olave
  Willington Ortiz
  Armando Osma
  Ever Palacios
  Helibelton Palacios
  Oscar Pareja
  Andrés Pérez
  John Wilmar Pérez
  Harold Preciado
  Jorge Ramírez Gallego
  Bernardo Redín
  Hamilton Ricard
  Nelson Rivas
  Hugo Rodallega
  Ángel María Torres
  Diego Umaña
  Carlos Valderrama
  Camilo Vargas
  Alexander Viveros
  Mario Yepes
  Cristian Zapata
  Pedro Zape
  Blas Pérez
  Arístides del Puerto
  Darío Caballero
  Roberto Fernández
  Buenaventura Ferreira
  Jorge Amado Nunes
  Miguel Ángel Loayza
  Valeriano López
  Guillermo de Amores
  Ernesto Hernández
  Juan Castillo
  Juan Salaberry
  Rafael Dudamel

Managers

Women

Deportivo Cali Femenino is the women's football section of Deportivo Cali and they currently play in the Colombian Women's Football League, the top level women's football league in Colombia. Founded in 2019, the club is one of four to have won the Colombian women's football league, winning the title in 2021 and having one runner-up finish the following season, while also placing fourth at the 2022 Copa Libertadores Femenina.

References

External links

 Deportivo Cali official website
 Club profile at Dimayor
 Deportivo Cali at Soccerway

 
Football clubs in Colombia
Association football clubs established in 1912
Categoría Primera A clubs
1912 establishments in Colombia
Fan-owned football clubs